Statistics of Niislel Lig in the 2011 season. The title was won by FC Ulaanbaatar which was their first ever title.

League standings
In the first round of the competition, all the teams played each other twice. The top four teams advanced to the semi-finals.

Play-offs

Semi-finals

Final

Super Cup
The 2011 Super Cup was played on 1 October 2011 between the league champion FC Ulaanbaatar and the cup winner Erchim. The winner would qualify for the 2012 AFC President's Cup.

Erchim won 2–1 and became the first Mongolian representative in the AFC President's Cup.

References

External links
FIFA.com
Soccerway.com

Mongolia Premier League seasons
Mongolia
Mongolia
football